D35 is a state road in the northwestern Croatia connecting Sveti Križ Začretje and the A2 motorway Sveti Križ Začretje interchange to Varaždin and the A4 motorway Varaždin interchange.

The road, as well as all other state roads in Croatia, is managed and maintained by Hrvatske ceste, state owned company.

Traffic volume 

Traffic is regularly counted and reported by Hrvatske ceste, operator of the road.

Road junctions and populated areas

Maps

Sources

D035
D035
D035